Hour Magazine may refer to:

 Hour Community, a weekly entertainment newspaper formerly published in Montreal (now defunct)
 Hour Magazine (TV series), a syndicated talk show hosted by Gary Collins, which aired from 1980 to 1988